Charlie's Angels is an American action crime drama television series developed by Alfred Gough and Miles Millar. The series is a remake based on the 1976–1981 series of the same name created by Ivan Goff and Ben Roberts and the second series in the Charlie's Angels franchise.

Charlie's Angels premiered on ABC on September 22, 2011. On October 14, 2011, the day after the fourth episode, low ratings led ABC to cancel the series. Three more episodes aired, with the eighth episode left unaired in the United States.

Cast and characters

Main
 Annie Ilonzeh as Kate Prince, a former Miami cop
 Minka Kelly as Eve French, a former street racer
 Rachael Taylor as Abby Sampson, a former thief
 Ramon Rodriguez as John Bosley, a former hacker

Recurring
 Victor Garber as the voice of Charles "Charlie" Townsend (uncredited)

Guest stars

 Carlos Bernard as Nestor Rodrigo / Pajaro, an elusive mastermind (in episode "Angel with a Broken Wing")
 Ivana Milicevic as Nadia Ivanov, a former wife of Rodrigo (in episode "Angel with a Broken Wing")
 Nadine Velazquez as Gloria Martinez, a former Angel and Eve's deceased friend (in episode "Angel with a Broken Wing")
 Isaiah Mustafa as Ray Goodson, a detective and Kate's ex-fiance (in episodes "Runway Angels" and "Royal Angels")
 Erica Durance as Samantha Masters, CIA operative and John's ex-girlfriend (in episode "Angels in Chains")
 John Terry as Victor Sampson, Abby's father (in episodes "Angels in Paradise" and "Black Hat Angels")
 Peyton List as Zoe Sinclair / Oswald, a hacker who works against the Angels (in episode "Black Hat Angels")

Production

Development
A remake of the original series had been announced since late 2009, when screenwriter Josh Friedman was hired to write a pilot script. Friedman's script was ultimately rejected, and ABC hired Smallville creators Alfred Gough and Miles Millar to pen a new version. In an interview, Alfred Gough expressed his desire to avoid doing anything "campy or retro." He later stated, "The characters are real and emotionally grounded, but they still like to have fun, wear great clothes, solve crime, and kick some serious ass...we hope to surprise people and bring a whole new generation to Charlie's Angels."

Robert Wagner was set to star as Charlie, but due to scheduling conflicts, had to exit the project. After an exhaustive search, Victor Garber was finally cast as the new voice of Charlie.

Veteran television director Marcos Siega directed the pilot. Filming began in Miami on March 8, 2011. On May 13, 2011, ABC picked the project up to series. ABC later announced that the show would air Thursdays at 8:00 pm Eastern/7:00 pm Central, starting at the beginning of the 2011–12 United States network television season.

Cancellation
Thirteen episodes of the series were ordered. However, after the fourth episode aired, ABC announced on October 14, 2011 that it had decided to cancel the series because of the low ratings. The eighth and final episode of the show was never aired on ABC, but was aired by AXN in Poland in late December 2011 and by Cinemax Latinoamerica and by E4 in the UK in January 2012.

Shortly before the show ended, Minka Kelly made a post of her thoughts on Twitter about the cancellation of the show with her fans. "I've had a wonderful time working with this incredible crew and amazing cast. I've made friends 4 life! A beautiful experience. #CharliesAngels." ABC president Paul Lee stated also after the cancellation of the show, “I don't think we breathed life into that franchise but I think it was a strong attempt.”

Episodes

Broadcast
 The American Forces Network, for military viewers stationed overseas.
 Canada by CTV, where it aired an hour earlier on the same night as the ABC broadcasts.
 New Zealand by TV2, After cancellation in the US, TVNZ pulled the show. It is set to return at a later date.
 United Kingdom by E4 aired all 8 episodes (including last episode which was never aired by ABC) through January 2012.
 Italy by Rai 2 from January 8, 2012
 Latin America by Cinemax Latinoamerica aired all 8 episodes (including last episode which was never aired by ABC) from November 30, 2011 through January 7, 2012.
 Germany by local AXN, all 8 episodes starting on May 17, 2012.
 France by Canal+ Family, all 8 episodes from October 29, 2012 through November 8, 2012. Rerun on NT1 from July 4, 2014 through July 18, 2014.

Home media
Charlie's Angels was released on DVD on June 5, 2012 from Sony Pictures Home Entertainment.

Reception

Critical response
The show received mostly negative reviews. Many reviewers criticized the acting, confusing plot, and useless action scenes. The review aggregator website Rotten Tomatoes reported that 0% of critics have given the series a positive review based on 32 reviews, with an average rating of 2.63/10. The site's critics consensus reads, "A thoroughly mediocre reboot of a fondly remembered series, this new Charlie Angels lacks even the camp value needed to make it a guilty pleasure." Metacritic gives the show a weighted average score of 30 out of 100 based on reviews from 22 critics, indicating "generally unfavorable reviews".

Matthew Gilbert of The Boston Globe gave the show a "C" grade commenting "The underwhelming cast brings nothing to the boilerplate action. Kelly is miscast as a biker chick, and making Bosley a hunk with computer skills fails to add life." IGN's Matt Fowler named the pilot the worst pilot of the fall, pointing out the bad acting and writing, saying that he didn't "believe that these ladies could change a flat tire, much less take down a notorious human trafficker" and that the series should have gone dark like Nikita or copied the tone of Burn Notice.

On December 26, 2011 Hitfix.com's Alan Sepinwall  listed the reboot on his "Lumps of coal: The worst TV I watched in 2011", stating "it just chose horribly wrong, with a grim, ultra-serious take that robbed whatever campy/cheesey fun you might have expected from the brand name, and with a collection of terrible performances and bad writing that undercut any attempt to give the Angels some dramatic heft."

Ratings
The pilot episode drew only a 2.1/6 among the 18–49 demos with 8.76 million viewers in Thursday slot on ABC.

References

External links
 

American action adventure television series
2010s American crime drama television series
2010s American mystery television series
2011 American television series debuts
2011 American television series endings
American Broadcasting Company original programming
English-language television shows
Television series by Sony Pictures Television
Television series reboots
Television shows set in Miami
Charlie's Angels (franchise)
American detective television series
Television series created by Alfred Gough
Television series created by Miles Millar